Luiz Philipe Lins Pimentel do Amaral (born August 17, 1985) is a Brazilian mixed martial artist, who competes in the light heavyweight division of the Ultimate Fighting Championship. He won the 2018 Professional Fighters League heavyweight tournament.

Mixed martial arts career

Early career
Lins made his professional MMA debut in August 2005.  For the first eight years of his career he fought exclusively in his native Brazil although he did take an extended break from MMA competition from 2006–2011.  He remained undefeated during his time in Brazil, earning a record of seven wins and no losses.

Before signing with Bellator, Lins was ranked by MMA news site Bloody Elbow as the second best Light Heavyweight prospect in 2012.

Bellator MMA
Lins made his North American and Bellator MMA debut in April 2014 at Bellator 116.  He faced Travis Clark and won via rear-naked choke submission in the first round.

In the summer of 2014, Lins was announced as a participant in the Bellator Light Heavyweight Tournament.  He faced Austin Heidlage in the opening quarterfinals at Bellator 121 and won via submission in the first round.  He faced Kelly Anundson in the semifinals and lost due to a knee injury.

Lins was expected to return against Francis Carmont at Bellator MMA & Glory: Dynamite 1 on September 19, 2015, however pulled out of the bout due to illness.

Lins faced Guilherme Viana at Bellator 159 on July 23, 2016. He won the fight via TKO in the second round.

Lins faced Kleber Silva at Bellator 168 on December 10, 2016. He lost the fight via TKO in the second round.

Lins faced Vadim Nemkov at Bellator 182 on August 25, 2017. He lost the fight via knockout in the first round.

On February 20, 2018 it was announced that Bellator had released Lins from the promotion.

Professional Fighters League
In the fall of 2018, Lins entered the PFL Heavyweight tournament. At PFL 8 on October 5, 2018, he defeated Caio Alencar by guillotine choke submission in the quarterfinal round and then defeated Jared Rosholt by TKO in the semifinal round. Lins faced Josh Copeland in the finals at PFL 11 on December 31, 2018. He won the fight via technical knockout in the fourth round to win the PFL Heavyweight Tournament and earn the $1 million cash prize.

Lins was expected to defend his championship in the second season of PFL, but had to withdraw from the whole season due to an injury.

Ultimate Fighting Championship
Lins was scheduled to make his UFC debut against former UFC Heavyweight Champion, Andrei Arlovski on May 2, 2020 at UFC Fight Night: Hermansson vs. Weidman. However, on April 9, Dana White, the president of UFC announced that this event was postponed   and rescheduled to May 13, 2020 at UFC Fight Night: Smith vs. Teixeira. He lost the fight via unanimous decision.

Lins faced Tanner Boser on June 27, 2020 at UFC on ESPN: Poirier vs. Hooker. He lost the fight via knockout in round one.

Lins was scheduled to face Don'Tale Mayes on November 7, 2020 at UFC on ESPN: Santos vs. Teixeira.  However on October 14, it was announced that Lins had a knee injury and pulled out of the event. Mayes is now expected to face Roque Martinez at this event.

Lins was scheduled to face Ben Rothwell on March 13, 2021 at UFC Fight Night 187. However, during the week leading up to the event the bout was removed from the card due to undisclosed reasons. The pairing remained intact and  the bout was rescheduled on May 8, 2021 at UFC on ESPN 24. While Rothwell made weight without issue, Lins never showed up to the weigh-ins and withdrew from the bout due to an illness. The bout was rescheduled again for May 22, 2021 at UFC Fight Night: Font vs. Garbrandt.  However, yet again, Lins was pulled from the event for undisclosed reason and he was replaced by newcomer Askhar Mozharov.

Lins was scheduled to face Ovince Saint Preux on November 13, 2021 at UFC Fight Night 197. However Saint Preux withdrew from the fight for undisclosed reasons  and the bout was cancelled.

Lins was scheduled to face Azamat Murzakanov December 4, 2021 at UFC on ESPN 31. However, Lins withdrew from the event for undisclosed reasons and he was replaced by Jared Vanderaa.

Lins faced Marcin Prachnio on April 23, 2022 at UFC Fight Night 205. He won the fight via unanimous decision.

Lins was scheduled to face Maxim Grishin on on October 1, 2022, at UFC Fight Night 211. Despite both men weighing in successfully, the bout was cancelled while the event was in progress due to an undisclosed medical issue.

Lins was scheduled to face Ovince Saint Preux, replacing Alexander Gustafsson, on 10 December 2022, at UFC 282. However, Lins subsequently withdrew from the bout due to an undisclosed reason.

The match between Lins and Ovince Saint Preux was rescheduled for February 18, 2023 at UFC Fight Night 219. He won the fight via knockout in the first round.

Championships and accomplishments
Professional Fighters League
2018 Heavyweight Tournament champion

Mixed martial arts record

|-
|Win
|align=center|16–5
|Ovince Saint Preux
|KO (punches)
|UFC Fight Night: Andrade vs. Blanchfield
|
|align=center|1
|align=center|0:49
|Las Vegas, Nevada, United States
|
|-
|Win
|align=center|15–5
|Marcin Prachnio
|Decision (unanimous)
|UFC Fight Night: Lemos vs. Andrade
|
|align=center|3
|align=center|5:00
|Las Vegas, Nevada, United States
|
|-
|Loss
|align=center|14–5
|Tanner Boser
|KO (punches)
|UFC on ESPN: Poirier vs. Hooker
|
|align=center|1
|align=center|2:41
|Las Vegas, Nevada, United States
|
|-
|Loss
|align=center|14–4
|Andrei Arlovski
|Decision (unanimous)
|UFC Fight Night: Smith vs. Teixeira
|
|align=center|3
|align=center|5:00
|Jacksonville, Florida, United States
|
|-
|Win
|align=center|14–3
|Josh Copeland
|TKO (knees and punches)
|PFL 11
|
|align=center|4
|align=center|0:30
|New York City, New York, United States 
|
|-
|Win
|align=center|13–3
|Jared Rosholt
|TKO (punches)
| rowspan=2|PFL 8
| rowspan=2|
|align=center|2
|align=center|0:45
| rowspan=2|New Orleans, Louisiana, United States
|
|-
|Win
|align=center|12–3
|Caio Alencar
| Submission (guillotine choke)
|align=center|1
|align=center|0:58
|
|-
|Win
|align=center|11–3
|Alex Nicholson
|TKO (punches)
|PFL 4
|
|align=center| 2
|align=center| 3:39
|Uniondale, New York, United States 
|
|-
|Loss
|align=center|10–3
|Vadim Nemkov
|KO (punches)
|Bellator 182
|
|align=center|1
|align=center|3:03
|Verona, New York, United States
|
|-
|Loss
|align=center|10–2
|Kleber Silva
|TKO (punches)
|Bellator 168
|
|align=center|2
|align=center|3:42
|Florence, Italy
|
|-
|Win
|align=center|10–1
|Guilherme Viana
|TKO (punches)
|Bellator 159
|
|align=center|2
|align=center|1:13
|Mulvane, Kansas, United States
|
|-
|Loss
|align=center|9–1
|Kelly Anundson
|TKO (knee injury)
|Bellator 122
|
|align=center|1
|align=center|1:40
|Temecula, California, United States
|
|-
|Win
|align=center| 9–0
|Austen Heidlage
|Submission (rear-naked choke)
|Bellator 121
|
|align=center|1
|align=center|2:45
|Thackerville, Oklahoma, United States
|
|-
|Win
|align=center| 8–0
|Travis Clark
|Submission (rear-naked choke)
|Bellator 116
|
|align=center| 1
|align=center| 0:40
|Temecula, California, United States
| 
|-
|Win
|align=center| 7–0
|Armando Sixel
|TKO (punches)
|Bitetti Combat 18
|
|align=center| 2
|align=center| 3:30
|Rio de Janeiro, Brazil
| 
|-
|Win
|align=center| 6–0
|Ubiratan Lima
|Decision (unanimous)
|Bitetti Combat 17
|
|align=center| 3
|align=center| 5:00
|Rio de Janeiro, Brazil
|
|-
|Win
|align=center| 5–0
|Daniel Alexandre Freitas Bonfim
|KO (punches)
|Rockstrike MMA 1
| 
|align=center| 1
|align=center| 4:40
|Brasília, Brazil
| 
|-
|Win
|align=center| 4–0
|Antonio Mendes
|Decision (unanimous)
|Nordeste Combat Championship
|
|align=center| 3
|align=center| 5:00
|Natal, Brazil
| 
|-
|Win
|align=center| 3–0
|Anderson Cruz
|Submission (triangle choke)
|Tremons Fight 2
|
|align=center| 1
|align=center| 2:13
|João Câmara, Brazil
| 
|-
|Win
|align=center| 2–0
|Antonio Mendes	
|KO (punches)
|Bad Boy: Vale Tudo Open
|
|align=center| 2
|align=center| N/A
|Fortaleza, Brazil
| 
|-
|Win
|align=center| 1–0
|Maurilio de Souza da Silva
|TKO (punches)
|Mossoró Fight
|
|align=center| 2
|align=center| 1:05
|Mossoró, Brazil
|

References

External links

See also
 List of current UFC fighters

Brazilian male mixed martial artists
Mixed martial artists utilizing Brazilian jiu-jitsu
Brazilian practitioners of Brazilian jiu-jitsu
1985 births
Living people
People awarded a black belt in Brazilian jiu-jitsu
People from Natal, Rio Grande do Norte
Ultimate Fighting Championship male fighters
Sportspeople from Rio Grande do Norte